Yucul Genetic Reserve is a  nature reserve in Nicaragua. It is one of the 78 reserves which are officially under protection in the country.

References 

Protected areas of Nicaragua
Central American pine–oak forests